RYRYRYRY... is a character string that was widely used to test a five-level teleprinter or RTTY channel. The characters R and Y are "01010" and "10101" in 5-bit ITA2 code, also known as Baudot. Thus they are Boolean  complements of each other.

Switching between the two characters is a stressful test for electromechanical teleprinters.
Repeated over and over, RYRYRYRY... outputs a carrier wave that regularly and rapidly shifts back and forth in frequency.

Test tapes where also made with a repeating RY sequence.  This was used by technicians to align the Bias adjustment on equipment such as the 43A1 carrier channel terminal

This signal pattern also provided a test for signal polarity; if polarity was reversed, the test signal would print as "SG".

The corresponding string of complementary characters in 7-bit ASCII is U*U*U*U*...

The RYRYRY sequence usage can be seen on the following DDH47 weather station broadcast excerpt:

  CQ CQ CQ DE DDH47 DDH9 DDH8
  FREQUENCIES   147.3 kHz   11039 kHz   14467.3 kHz
  RYRYRYRYRYRYRYRYRYRYRYRYRYRYRYRYRYRYRYRYRYRYRYRYRYRYRYRYRYRYRYRY
  CQ CQ CQ DE DDH47 DDH9 DDH8
  FREQUENCIES   147.3 kHz   11039 kHz   14467.3 kHz
  RYRYRYRYRYRYRYRYRYRYRYRYRYRYRYRYRYRYRYRYRYRYRYRYRYRYRYRYRYRYRYRY
  CQ CQ CQ DE DDH47 DDH9 DDH8
  FREQUENCIES   147.3 kHz   11039 kHz   14467.3 kHz
  RYRYRYRYRYRYRYRYRYRYRYRYRYRYRYRYRYRYRYRYRYRYRYRYRYRYRYRYRYRYRYRY
  ZCZC 643     
  WWXX60 EDZW 150900
  NAUTISCHE WARNNACHRICHTEN VOM 15.09.2017 UM 09 UTC
  STRONGWIND GALE STORMWARNINGS FOR GERMAN BIGHT AND BALTIC SEA
  STARKWIND STURMWARNUNGEN FUER NORD UND OSTSEE
  NO WARNINGS IN FORCE
  KEINE WARNUNGEN IN KRAFT

References

History of telecommunications
Test items